Actin, cytoplasmic 2, or gamma-actin is a protein that in humans is encoded by the ACTG1 gene. Gamma-actin is widely expressed in cellular cytoskeletons of many tissues; in adult striated muscle cells, gamma-actin is localized to Z-discs and costamere structures, which are responsible for force transduction and transmission in muscle cells. Mutations in ACTG1 have been associated with nonsyndromic hearing loss and Baraitser-Winter syndrome, as well as susceptibility of adolescent patients to vincristine toxicity.

Structure 

Human gamma-actin is 41.8 kDa in molecular weight and 375 amino acids in length. Actins are highly conserved proteins that are involved in various types of cell motility, and maintenance of the cytoskeleton. In vertebrates, three main groups of actin paralogs, alpha, beta, and gamma, have been identified.

The alpha actins are found in muscle tissues and are a major constituent of the sarcomere contractile apparatus. The beta and gamma actins co-exist in most cell types as components of the cytoskeleton, and as mediators of internal cell motility. Actin, gamma 1, encoded by this gene, is found in non-muscle cells in the cytoplasm, and in muscle cells at costamere structures, or transverse points of cell-cell adhesion that run perpendicular to the long axis of myocytes.

Function 

In myocytes, sarcomeres adhere to the sarcolemma via costameres, which align at Z-discs and M-lines. The two primary cytoskeletal components of costameres are desmin intermediate filaments and gamma-actin microfilaments. It has been shown that gamma-actin interacting with another costameric protein dystrophin is critical for costameres forming mechanically strong links between the cytoskeleton and the sarcolemmal membrane. Additional studies have shown that gamma-actin colocalizes with alpha-actinin and GFP-labeled gamma actin localized to Z-discs, whereas GFP-alpha-actin localized to pointed ends of thin filaments, indicating that gamma actin specifically localizes to Z-discs in striated muscle cells.

During development of myocytes, gamma actin is thought to play a role in the organization and assembly of developing sarcomeres, evidenced in part by its early colocalization with alpha-actinin. Gamma-actin is eventually replaced by sarcomeric alpha-actin isoforms, with low levels of gamma-actin persisting in adult myocytes which associate with Z-disc and costamere domains.

Insights into the function of gamma-actin in muscle have come from studies employing transgenesis. In a skeletal muscle-specific knockout of gamma-actin in mice, these animals showed no detectable abnormalities in development; however, knockout mice showed muscle weakness and fiber necrosis, along with decreased isometric twitch force, disrupted intrafibrillar and interfibrillar connections among myocytes, and myopathy.

Clinical significance 
An autosomal dominant mutation in ACTG1 in the DFNA20/26 locus at 17q25-qter was identified in patients with hearing loss. A Thr278Ile mutation was identified in helix 9 of gamma-actin protein, which is predicted to alter protein structure. This study identified the first disease causing mutation in gamma-actin and underlies the importance of gamma-actin as structural elements of the inner ear hair cells. Since then, other ACTG1 mutations have been linked to nonsyndromic hearing loss, including Met305Thr.

A missense mutation in ACTG1 at Ser155Phe has also been identified in patients with Baraitser-Winter syndrome, which is a developmental disorder characterized by congenital ptosis, excessively-arched eyebrows, hypertelorism, ocular colobomata, lissencephaly, short stature, seizures and hearing loss.

Differential expression of ACTG1 mRNA was also identified in patients with Sporadic Amyotrophic Lateral Sclerosis, a devastating disease with unknown causality, using a sophisticated bioinformatics approach employing Affymetrix long-oligonucleotide BaFL methods.

Single nucleotide polymorphisms in ACTG1 have been associated with vincristine toxicity, which is part of the standard treatment regimen for childhood acute lymphoblastic leukemia. Neurotoxicity was more frequent in patients that were ACTG1 Gly310Ala mutation carriers, suggesting that this may play a role in patient outcomes from vincristine treatment.

Interactions 
ACTG1 has been shown to interact with:
 CAP1, 
 DMD,
 TMSB4X, and  
 Plectin.

See also 
 Actin

References

External links

Further reading 

 
 
 
 
 
 
 
 
 
 
 
 
 
 
 
 
 
 
 
 

Proteins